Alessandro Rottoli (born 27 February 1981 in Bergamo) is an Italian professional footballer, who currently plays for U.S. Mapello Calcio.

Career
The defender played during his career in the Primavera team from Inter Milan, Alzano Virescit, US Cisanese, FBC Derthona 1908, A.C. Merate, Unione Sportiva Olginatese, F.C.D. Lottogiaveno, A.C. Voghera, S.S. Tritium 1908 and in Estonia for Levadia Maardu.

Notes

1981 births
Living people
FCI Levadia Tallinn players
Italian footballers
Expatriate footballers in Estonia
Footballers from Bergamo
Inter Milan players
Association football defenders
A.S.D. HSL Derthona players
Tritium Calcio 1908 players
U.S.D. Olginatese players
F.C.D. Lottogiaveno players
Virtus Bergamo Alzano Seriate 1909 players
Meistriliiga players